George Gardiner (March 17, 1877 – July 8, 1954) was a famous Irish boxer in America who was the first undisputed World Light Heavyweight Champion. He held claims to both the World Middleweight Title as well as the World Heavyweight Title. He was the second man in history to hold the World's Light Heavyweight title, defeating the first Light Heavyweight Champion, Jack Root, by KO after 12 rounds.

Legacy
George Gardner's name is often misspelled "George Gardiner", which was an alias although some believe it was the correct spelling. He signed his name "George Gardner", though several newspapers of his era spelled his name "George Gardiner". However, his brother, Jimmy Gardner, signed his name "Jimmy Gardiner" when handing out autographs. George Gardner is unfortunately most remembered as the 26-year-old champion who lost his title to the 41-year-old Bob Fitzsimmons after a questionable 20 round decision on points. The decision made Fitzsimmons a legend, as it made him the first triple title division champion in boxing history.

Background
Gardner was born on March 17, 1877, at County Clare, Ireland on St. Patrick's Day. He was believed to have been the son of an Irish prizefighter and came from poverty. George and his brothers, Billy and Jimmy Gardner, were each recognized as accomplished boxers in their era.

Professional career
Gardner began his career in 1897 when he was 20 years old. He was almost six feet tall and weighed between 150–175 pounds during his career. He won several fights in the New England area, being noted in newspapers as the "Middleweight Champion of New England".

Middleweight champion of the World
Gardner was the top middleweight contender in 1901 and claimed the World's Middleweight Title that year. He defeated Frank Craig, the Colored Middleweight Champion at London, England, and newspapers declared that Gardner "secured the World Middleweight Title". Afterwards, Gardner challenged Tommy Ryan for the title, but Ryan declined although Gardner was the number one contender for the title.

Gardner first claimed the world middleweight title on August 30, 1901, at the Mechanic's Pavilion in San Francisco after knocking out Kid Carter in a fight billed as the "Middleweight Championship of the World". He then defeated Barbados Joe Walcott, the Welterweight Champion of the World, in a 20 round rematch in 1902.  On August 18, 1902, Gardiner TKO'd the undefeated Jack Root in 17 rounds at Salt Lake City, Utah, in a close fight billed as both the light heavyweight and middleweight championship of the world. Both fighters weighed in at 165 pounds.

On October 31, 1902, Gardner fought 20 rounds with Jack Johnson, the first African American to hold the World's Heavyweight Title. Gardner weighed in at 155 while Johnson at held a 30 pound weight advantage at 185. Johnson won on points by knocking Gardner down twice in the 8th and 14th rounds.

Light heavyweight champion of the World
Gardner was a contender for the newly created World's Light Heavyweight Title in 1903, weighing about 170 pounds. On April 6, 1903, Gardner fought Peter Maher, the Irish Heavyweight Champion, considered to be the most dangerous hitter of his era. Gardner knocked out Maher in round one and then defeated Marvin Hart by TKO after 12 rounds.

On July 4, 1903, at Ontario, Canada, at the International Athletic Club, after 12 rounds of fighting, George Gardner knocked out Jack Root for the Light - Heavyweight Championship of the World. He was the first Irish-American to hold the title and the first undisputed champion to hold the title. Most records state that Root was the first champion of the division, but others, including George Gardner, had claimed the title before. The Root - Gardner fight was the first Light-Heavyweight Title fight caught on film. Newspapers reported that Gardner knocked Root down seven times.

George Gardner defended his title later that year on November 25, 1903, at San Francisco, California, against Bob Fitzsimmons, who had killed two men in the ring and was the former Middleweight and Heavyweight Champion. After a questionable 20 round decision on points, Fitzsimmons knocked the young champion down twice and gained a slight decision. After losing the title, George Gardner challenged Fitzsimmons to a rematch, but was denied a second chance at the title.

Gardner was still a highly regarded contender for the Light Heavyweight Title, and was rated above Fitzsimmons. Nonetheless, Gardner set his sights on the World's Heavyweight Title. It was held by Marvin Hart, whom Gardner had defeated and drawn with before.

Gardner challenged Marvin Hart for the Heavyweight Championship of the World, but again he was denied a title shot. Afterwards, his career faded with losses and draws against Jim Flynn, Al Kaufman, Terry Mustain, and Tony Ross. Gardner retired at age 32 in 1908 with a record of 44 wins, 32 by way of knockout, 12 losses, 7 draws, and 3 no contests.

Gardner continued to box, but considered himself a "washed-up prize fighter". He was reputed to have fought in over 300 battles. Onenewspaper source noted that Gardner "had drawn from their seats in applause more fight fans than any other light-heavyweight".

Later life
Gardner opened a saloon in Chicago, and married Margaret Smith of South Bend, Indiana. He fathered a son in 1905, who also became a professional boxer in the Light Heavyweight division under the name, "Morgan Gardiner".  Gardner's brother, Jimmy Gardner, claimed the World's Welterweight Title in 1908, making the Gardner brothers the first Irish American siblings in world history to hold world titles.

George Gardner was pictured in the summer of 1930 on the front of "Self Defense Quarterly".

Gardner was once ranked the #1 fighter in the world and he is considered one of the top fighters of all time, as well as one of the top light-heavyweights of all time.

Gardner died at age 77 on July 10, 1954, in Chicago. Four ex-champions were pallbearers at his funeral.

Professional boxing record

All newspaper decisions are officially regarded as “no decision” bouts and are not counted in the win/loss/draw column.

See also
List of light heavyweight boxing champions
List of bare-knuckle boxers
List of light heavyweight boxing champions

Notes

References

External links
 

1877 births
1954 deaths
Irish emigrants to the United States (before 1923)
Bare-knuckle boxers
Light-heavyweight boxers
Sportspeople from County Clare
World boxing champions
Irish male boxers